Al-Jalama was a Palestinian village about 14 kilometres south-east of Haifa. It was depopulated in 1948.

History
The village was situated just above Khirbat Asafna. Excavations between 1964 and 1971 showed that the site had been occupied intermittently from the first to the fourth century CE.

In the British Mandate period in Palestine, the village was classified as a hamlet in the Palestine Index Gazetteer.
In the 1931 census of Palestine, Al-Jalama was counted under Isfiya.

In 1948 al-Jalama was depopulated and the area was subsequently incorporated into the State of Israel after the war. The Kishon prison, also known as the Al Jalame detention centre, was later established on the village site.

The Palestinian historian Walid Khalidi described the village site in 1992: "A military camp occupies the area, which is covered by eucalyptus trees."

See also
Depopulated Palestinian locations in Israel

References

Bibliography

External links
Welcome to al-Jalama
al-Jalama (Haifa), Zochrot
Survey of Western Palestine, Map 5:   IAA, Wikimedia commons 
Jalame, tour, 10.4.04 from Zochrot

Arab villages depopulated after the 1948 Arab–Israeli War
District of Haifa